Wolf Durmashkin (Wulf Duhr-MASH-k'n) (Lithuania, March 7, 1914 in Lithuania – September 18 or 19, 1944 in Klooga concentration camp, Estonia) was a Jewish composer, conductor and pianist in Vilnius (then known as Vilna), Lithuania.

Life 
Wolf Durmashkin was born in Lithuania, the exact place of birth is unknown. 
He was the son of Akiva Durmashkin, liturgical music director and choir leader, and Shayna Durmashkin.  His sisters were Fania Durmashkin and Henia Durmashkin.

He graduated from the Vilna Conservatory of Music and the Warsaw Conservatory.
He produced and directed the opera "Aida" in Hebrew.

Wolf Durmashkin was appointed conductor of the Vilna Symphony in 1939 at the age of 25.
He organized a symphony orchestra and a 100-voice Hebrew choir while incarcerated in the Vilna Ghetto.

The ghetto orchestra performed 35 chamber and symphonic concerts in the 15 months of its existence under his direction.

In September 1943 when the Vilna Ghetto was liquidated, Wolf Durmashkin was taken to the Klooga, Estonia concentration camp.

He was executed on September 18 or 19, 1944.

Wolf Durmashkin Composition Award 
The Wolf Durmashkin Composition Award, short WDCA,is an international composition contest, as well as a music- and composition award designed by the German cultural society dieKunstBauStelle in Landsberg am Lech. It is named after Wolf Durmashkin. 
The award was founded in 2018 by Karla Schönebeck and Wolfgang Hauck. The cause was the 70th anniversary of a concert played by Jewish Holocaust survivors from the DP-Orchestra in Landsberg am Lech on the 10th of May 1948. It was conducted by Leonard Bernstein.

Literature 
 Herman Kruk, "The Last Days of the Jerusalem of Lithuania, Chronicles from the Vilna Ghetto and the Camps, 1939–1944, trans. By Barbara Harshav (New York: YIVO Institute for Jewish Research, 2002)
 Rachel Kostanian-Danzig, "Spiritual Resistance in the Vilna Ghetto (Vilna: Vilna Gaon Jewish State Museum), 112
 Cantore natan Stolnitz, “Akiva Durmashkin and His Influence on Liturgical Music in Old Radom, " The Radomer Voice, April 1964
 Sonia Beker, "Symphony on Fire: A Story of Music and Spiritual Resistance During the Holocaust,” The Wordsmithy LLC, 2007),

References

External links 
 Wolf Durmashkin Music and holocaust 
 Wolf Durmashkin at geni 
 Wolf Durmashkin Archive for Wolf Durmashkin
 WDCA Wolf Durmashkin Composition Award An international composition award named after Wolf Durmashkin.

1914 births
1944 deaths
Jewish composers
Lithuanian Jews who died in the Holocaust
Lithuanian composers
People who died in Vaivara concentration camp
Vilna Ghetto inmates